The 2007 Coupe de la Ligue Final was a football match held at Stade de France, Saint-Denis on 31 March 2007, that saw FC Girondins de Bordeaux defeat Olympique Lyonnais 1–0 thanks to a goal by Henrique.

Match details

See also
2006–07 Coupe de la Ligue

External links
Report on LFP official site

2006–07 Coupe de la Ligue
2007
Olympique Lyonnais matches
FC Girondins de Bordeaux matches
March 2007 sports events in France
Sport in Saint-Denis, Seine-Saint-Denis
Football competitions in Paris
2007 in Paris